Slammer may refer to:
SQL Slammer, a computer worm
an AIM-120 AMRAAM missile, nicknamed Slammer
Sholef / Slammer, an Israeli self-propelled 155 mm howitzer based on a Merkava tank chassis
The Slammer, a children's talent show on BBC One
Slammer Guitars, a budget subsidiary of Hamer Guitars
Penn Jillette's house in Las Vegas, known as "the slammer"
Slammer (ride), the second S&S Power Sky Swat in the world, at Thorpe Park, Surrey, England
Slammer, an entity who changes a telephone carrier of a telephone line illegally (Telephone slamming)
British Rail Slam-door trains
Slammers, a mercenary unit in the science fiction Hammerverse
A type of POG

See also
Alabama Slammer, a cocktail
Tequila Slammer, a cocktail